The Cupra Tavascan is an electric concept sports utility vehicle (SUV) to be produced by Volkswagen Anhui, a joint venture between Volkswagen and Chinese company JAC Motors, and sold by Cupra, a subsidiary of SEAT. It was unveiled at the 2019 Frankfurt Motor Show. In March 2021, it was confirmed that production of the vehicle would begin with an estimated release date in 2024.

Technical characteristics 

The Tavascan is based on the MEB Platform, which is designed for electric vehicles of the Volkswagen Group, of which the Volkswagen ID.3 is the first production vehicle to use it.

References

External links

Tavascan
Upcoming car models
Electric concept cars